= Graffiti in Washington, D.C. =

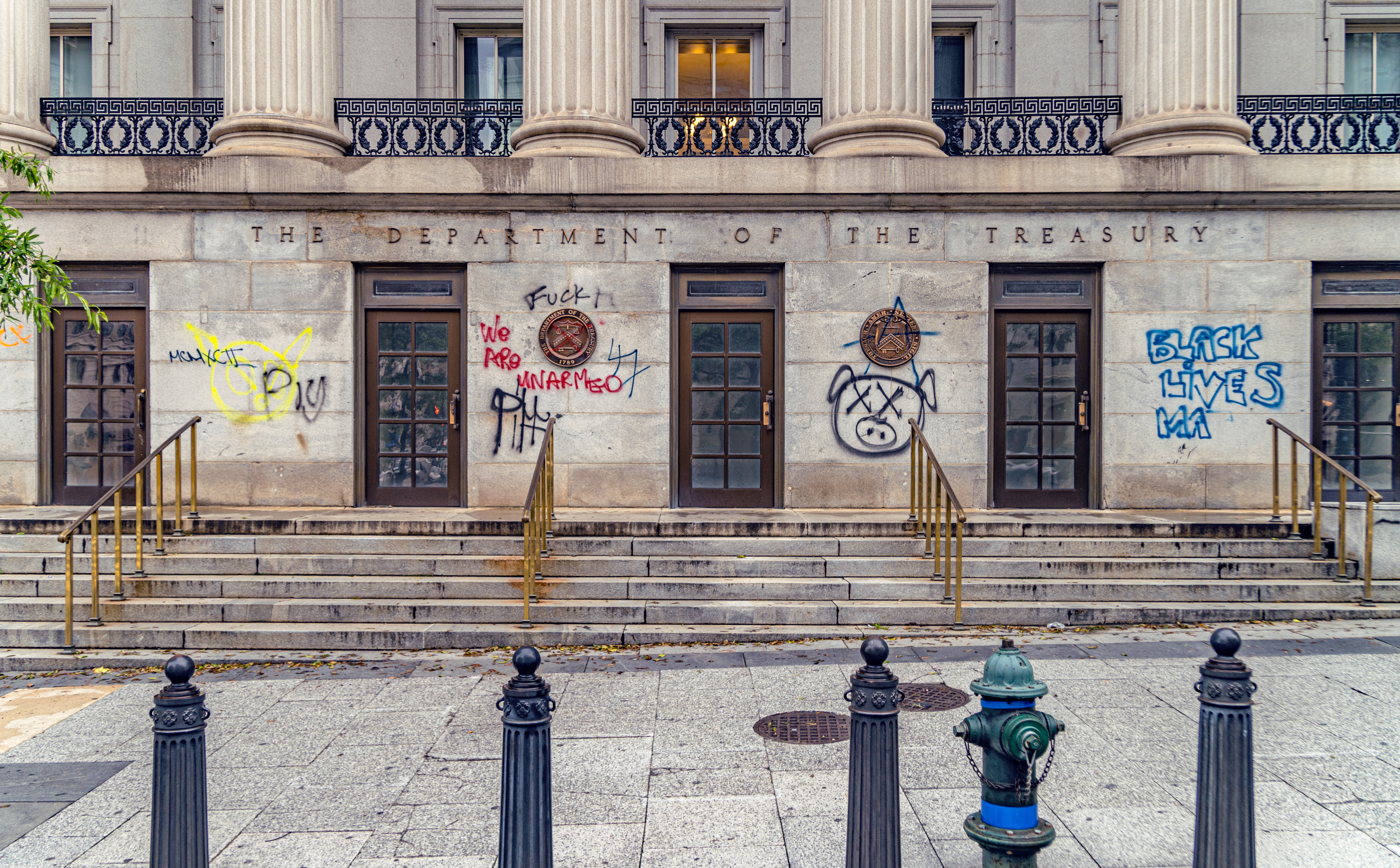
Graffiti on the side of a building in Washington, D.C., 2020

Graffiti is a cause of disagreement among residents of Washington, D.C., in the United States.
